Mirko Kovač is the name of:

 Mirko Kovač (basketball) (born 1983), Serbian professional basketball player
 Mirko Kovač (writer) (1938–2013), Yugoslav novelists